The Cup of China was one of the series of six senior-level, international figure skating competitions held as part of the ISU Grand Prix of Figure Skating. The Cup of China joined the series in 2003, and was cancelled in 2022 as China enforces strict preventive measures for overseas competitors during the COVID-19 pandemic. The competitors are selected by invitation only. Organized by the Chinese Skating Association, the Cup of China has been held in Beijing, Harbin, Nanjing, Shanghai, and Chongqing, usually in early November. Medals are awarded in the disciplines of men's singles, ladies' singles, pair skating, and ice dancing.

China declined to host any ISU-sanctioned figure skating event during the 2018–19 season in order to, among stated reasons, prepare its venues for the 2022 Winter Olympics. Finland hosted a replacement event on November 2–4, 2018, in Helsinki. The 2021 Cup of China was cancelled due to travel and quarantine restrictions related to the COVID-19 pandemic. On 21 July 2022, it was confirmed that MK John Wilson Trophy will be held in replacement of Cup of China, due to the COVID19 travel restrictions the country has strictly enforced. The 2023 event of the Cup of China is scheduled to be held in Chongqing in 10-12 November, 2023.

Medalists

Men

Ladies

Pairs

Ice dancing

Medals (2003-2020)

References

 
ISU Grand Prix of Figure Skating
International figure skating competitions hosted by China
2003 establishments in China
Recurring sporting events established in 2003